Louis Monziès (28 May 1849 – 13 March 1930) was a French painter and etcher. He was the curator of the three Museums of Le Mans for 10 years until his death.

Career 
Louis Monziès began to learn painting and etching in Paris in 1871 from the painters Jean-Louis Ernest Meissonier and Isidore Pils, and from the etcher Léon Gaucherel. He got second-class and third-class medals in 1876, 1880 and 1881 at the annual Salon in Paris.

He married Eugénie Alphonsine Courtignon in 1882 at Cherbourg and three children were born : Jean in 1889, Pierre in 1891 and Jacques in 1895. He lived then in Paris but he owned also a small house in Normandy near Gréville-Hague.

Louis Monziès carried out etchings for illustrated books and for Art publications, among them, those after Meissonier and Henri Pille. He became a member of the Société des artistes français in 1884 and also a member of the Société des Peintres-Graveurs français in 1891. He was quite popular in Parisian art salons with the Hédouins and in the literary gathering of the editor Lemerre who published famous living writers and poets with Louis' etchings.

Louis Monziès visited London and was named to the Royal Society of Painters-Etchers in 1894 when he received orders for illustrations for English books and publications. His etchings are included in major collections such as The British Library or the Museum of Fine Arts Boston.

But with photo-etching and other new publication processes, etchers were less and less able to make a good living from their skills. Louis Monziès move to Le Mans and became a painting teacher and a painting restoration specialist. He began to paint landscapes and urban environments in Normandy and in other towns like Venise or Avignon. He sold a lot of watercolors and oil paintings before the First World War. A few of these paintings were sent to the US by American officers housed by the painter at the end of the war.

He became the curator of the Museums of Le Mans in March 1920 and stayed so until his death in 1930.

Illustrated books and Art publications

Etchings after oil paintings
 Season of October (1894) after Bastien-Lepage
 The beggar (1881) after  Bastien-Lepage
 Aurore and Céphale after  Boucher
 Woman lying down after  Boucher
 Pastorale (1902) after  Boucher
 The Pilgrims from the Abbey of St. Odile  (1876) after Brion
 Burial of a Sailor at Villerville (1880) after Butin
 Hare after Chardin
 Sarah Bernard (1881) after Clairin
 Portrait of the etcher Schmidt after de La Tour
 The bath (1897) after Demont Breton
 Self-portrait with his family (1891) after de Vos
 Portrait of Ulysse Butin (1880) after  Duez
 Th birth after Duez
 Wedding at City Hall (1873) after Durand
 Portraits of Mr and Mrs Edwin Edwards after Fantin-Latour
 Young girl with small dogs (1888) after Fragonard
 Hawking (1877) after Fromentin
 Sarah Siddons after Gainsborough
 In 1795 (1895) after Goupil
 Wonderful after Goupil
 The payer after Greuze
 Whasherwomen after Heilbuth
 Bridesmaids to marry after Jiménez Aranda
 Henri de la Rochejacquelein after Le Blant
 Fishing (1880) after Leloir
 Apotheosis de Carpeaux (1892) after Maignan
 Bridge inn of Poissy (1889) after Meissonier
 Harlequin with a rose (1888) after Meissonier
 Son of Meissonier as Louis XIII (1888) after Meissonier
 Koubra in the workshop after Meissonier
 Young man reading after Meissonier
 At Diderot's Library (1885) after Meissonier
 Maréchal Duroc Duc de Frioul (1876) after Meissonier
 Musketeer after Meissonier
 Dutch woman and child after Neuhuys
 Portrait of woman in red after  Pontormo 
 The Martyrdom of Saint Sebastian (1879) after Ribot
 Henry VI after Seymour Lucas
 Confidence after Stevens 
 Rider on a sofa (1870) after Vibert
 Coquelin elder (1875) after Vibert
 Melon merchant (1876) after Vibert
 Lady Lindsay of Balcarres (1877) after  Watts 
 Hugo Van Der Goes at the convent of Rooden Cloestere (1875) after Wauters
 Flemish Postal Station after Wouwerman

Etchings for French books
 Abbé Prévost - Manon Lescaut, Lemerre, 1870, 1878 : etchings after Gravelot and Jacques Jean Pasquier
 Ackermann - Œuvres, Lemerre, 1877 : frontispiece
 Arène - Œuvres, Lemerre, 1877 : frontispiece
 Asselineau - Le livre des sonnets, Lemerre, 1893 : frontispiece
 Barbey d'Aurevilly - Le bonheur dans le crime, Société Normande du livre illustré, 1897 : etchings after Regamey
 Beaumarchais - Le barbier de Séville, Librairie des Bibliophiles, 1882 : etchings after Santiago Arcos
 Beaumarchais - Le mariage de Figaro, Librairie des Bibliophiles, 1882 : etchings after Santiago Arcos
 Bernardin de Saint-Pierre - Paul et Virginie, Lemerre 1877 : frontispiece
 Boileau- Œuvres, Lemerre, 1875 : etchings after Cochin
 Brillat-Savarin - Physiologie du goût, Carteret 1923
 Burty - L'eau-forte en 1875, Cadart 1875 : etching "L'amateur de tableaux"
 Burty - L'eau-forte en 1878, Cadart 1878 : etching "L'opinion du modèle"
 Châteaubrian - Œuvres, Lemerre, 1877 : frontispiece after Devéria
 Chénier - Poésies, Charpentier 1888 : etchings after Bida, 
 Claretie - Œuvres, Lemerre, 1886 : frontispiece
 Desbordes-Valmore- Œuvres poétiques, Lemerre 1886 : frontispiece
 Dorchain - Poésies, Lemerre, 1895 : frontispiece
 Flaubert, Théatre, Lemere, 1885 : frontispiece
 Hugo - Cromwell, Lemerre : frontispiece
 Hugo - Légende des siècles, Edition Nationale Emile Testard & Cie, 1886 : etchings after E. Bordes
 Hugo - Les Orientales, etchings
 Hugo - Odes et ballades, etchings
 Hugo - Notre-Dame de Paris, Lemerre, 1879 : etchings after Pille
 La Fontaine - Contes, Lemerre, 1876 : etchings after Fragonard, Lancret, Pater, Boucher, Eisen, Vleughels
 La Fontaine - Fables, Lemerre : etchings after Oudry
 Lafenestre - Le livre d'or du salon de peinture et de sculpture 1881, Librairie des bibliophile, 1881 : etching
 Lemaistre de Sacy - L'Histoire de Joseph, Hachette 1878 : etchings after Bida
 Lemaistre de Sacy - L'Histoire de Tobie, Hachette 1880 : etchings after Bida
 Lesage - Histoire de Gil Blas de Santillane, Lemerre : etchings after Pille
 Lesage - Le Diable boiteux, Lemerre : etchings after Pille
 Louvet de Couvray - Les amours du chevalier de Faublas, Librairie des Bibliophiles, 1884 : etchings after Avril
 Mantz - François Boucher, Quantin : etchings after Boucher
 Martial - L'Illustration nouvelle par une société de peintres-graveurs à l'eau-forte, sixième année, Cadart 1879 : etching "Le joueur de Mandoline"
 Michelet, Jeanne d'Arc, Hachette, 1888 : etchings after Bida
 Musset, Œuvres, Lemerre, 1878 : etchings after Pille
 Perrault - Contes de Fées, Lemerre : etchings after Pille
 Portalis - Honoré Fragonard, sa vie et son oeuvre, Rothschild, 1889 : etching
 Racine, Œuvres, Lemerre, 1874 : etchings after Gravelot 
 Sarasin, frontispiece 
 Scarron - Le Roman Comique, Lemerre : etchings after Pille
 Shakespeare - Œuvres, Lemerre : etchings after Pille
 Uzanne - Caprices d'un bibliophile, 1878 : etchings
 Voltaire - Romans, Lemerre, 1878 : etchings after Monnet and Marillier

Etchings for English books 
 Brooks - Dames and Daughters of the French Court : portrait of Madame Valmore
 Charles and Mary Lamb - Tales from Shakespeare, Heath & Co, 1908 : etchings
 Chevillard Lenoir - Celebrated Artists Sketches of Their Lives and Works, Nims & Knight, 1888
 Comyns Carr - Examples of Contemporary Arts. Etchings from Representative Works by living English and Foreign Artists, 1878 : etching "Lady Lindsay of Balcarres" d'après Watts
 Hugo - Dramas, G. Barrie, 1896 : etching after E. Bordes
 Louvet de Couvray - The amours of the chevalier de Faublas, Société des Bibliophiles, 1898 : etchings after Avril
 Musset - All writings, Edwin C. Hill

References

External links 
 Louis Monziès : Biography and works (in French, an English version should be published soon)

1849 births
1930 deaths
French etchers
19th-century French painters
French male painters
20th-century French painters
20th-century French male artists
French watercolourists
Academic art
Painters from Paris
People from Le Mans
20th-century French printmakers
19th-century French male artists